Lochsley Thomson (born 20 August 1973) is a retired Australian high jumper.

He finished fifth at the 1994 Commonwealth Games. He also competed at the 1992 Olympic Games without reaching the final.

References

1973 births
Living people
Australian male high jumpers
Athletes (track and field) at the 1994 Commonwealth Games
Athletes (track and field) at the 1992 Summer Olympics
Olympic athletes of Australia
Commonwealth Games competitors for Australia